Iron Triangle may refer to:

In geography
 Iron Triangle (Korea), a Korean War term referring to an area in Korea bounded by Ch'orwon, Kumhwa, and Pyonggang
 Iron Triangle (Vietnam), the name U.S. forces in the Vietnam War gave to the Communist stronghold region northwest of Saigon
 Iron Triangle, Richmond, California, a neighborhood bounded on its three sides by railroad tracks
 Willets Point, Queens, New York, known as "Iron Triangle" for its metal works
 The Iron Triangle, a name given to the iron-producing region of South Australia, bounded by the mining towns of Iron Knob, Iron Baron and Iron Monarch, but more usually applied to the nearby industrial towns of Whyalla, Port Augusta and Port Pirie on the upper Spencer Gulf.
 The Iron Triangle, a junction of three major railroad lines in Fostoria, Ohio

In media
The Iron Triangle (film), a 1989 Vietnam War film shot in Sri Lanka starring Beau Bridges and Johnny Hallyday
 Nobunaga's Ambition: Iron Triangle, a 1983 game in the Nobunaga's Ambition series
 Iron Triangle, unofficial title of a collaboration of Wuxia and Kung Fu movie director Chang Cheh and actors Ti Lung and David Chiang starting in 1968, resulting in over 40 movies.

In military operations
Battle of the Iron Triangle, a battle in the Vietnam War that occurred on May 16, 1974
Operation Iron Triangle, a military operation in the Iraq War in 2006

In politics
 Iron triangle (US politics), a concept in U.S. politics involving a three-sided relationship among Congress, a Federal department or agency, and a particular industry or interest group.
 "Iron Triangle", three core members of President George W. Bush's political inner circle: Karl Rove, Joe Allbaugh, and Karen Hughes
 "Iron triangle", the relationship of the Japan's Liberal Democratic Party, the business sector (keiretsu), and the bureaucracy in post–World War II Japan
 More generally, any self-reinforcing power structure, whether intentional or accidental, formal or informal

In other uses
 Iron Triangle (also called Project triangle or Triple Constraint), a project management concept

See also
Triangle (musical instrument), also known as a dinner bell
Wye (rail), sometimes known as a railroad (iron rail) triangle
Iron triad, the elements iron, cobalt and nickel